Apaches is a 1977 British public information film. Produced by Graphic Films for the Central Office of Information (COI) for the Health and Safety Executive (HSE), it was shown extensively in the Southern, Westward, Anglia and ATV regions, before being shown either on film or videocassette in primary schools. It was shot on 16mm film at a Home Counties farm in February 1977, and child actors were selected from a school in Maidenhead, Berkshire. The 26-minute-long film deals with the subject of the dangers to children on farms, and has been seen in schools all over Britain, as well as Canada, Australia and the United States. The timeframe of the film is somewhat disjointed, giving a surreal feeling to the events portrayed.

The film was directed by John Mackenzie, written by Neville Smith and produced by John Arnold and Leon Clore.

The film, which dovetails the narrative conventions of the western with Public Information Films, follows the misadventures of a group of six young children (Kim, Sharon, Michael, Danny, Tom and Robert) in a rural British village who enjoy playing on a nearby farm. Throughout the film the children play at being "Apache warriors", hence the film's title. All but one die in various shocking accidents, largely due to the children's carelessness, suggesting that the children would still be alive if they had known what dangers lay ahead. It is narrated in-character by Danny (Robbie Oubridge).

Plot
Apaches follows the misadventures of a group of six young children (Kim, Sharon, Michael, Danny, Tom and Robert) in a rural British village who enjoy playing on a nearby farm pretending to be "Apache warriors".

Throughout the film the children all die in various different accidents due to their carelessness; Kim is run over by a tractor she was standing on, Tom drowns in a slurry pit he falls into, Sharon dies from accidentally drinking chemicals while pretending it was alcohol, Robert is crushed by a falling gate that Michael knocked over, and Danny crashes a tractor he is riding on into a ditch. Danny continues his narration after his death, and talks calmly about his family all arriving for a "party" being prepared earlier in the film.

Michael, also present, is revealed to be Danny's cousin – the only child not to have been killed by his own reckless behavior, despite Danny having described Michael as "daft". Danny's voice fades into a ghostly echo as he sadly says he wishes he could have gone to the party. The closing credits show a long list of real children who had died in actual farm accidents in the year before Apaches was made.

Cast 
 Robbie Oubridge as Danny
 Ian Scrace as Michael
 Wayne Tapsfield as Robert
 Sharon Smart as Sharon
 Fion Smith as Tom
 Louise O'Hara as Kim

Home viewing availability
Apaches was made available for home viewing by the BFI in 2010, along with other such Public Information Films of the time such as Building Sites Bite, on the compilation DVD COI Collection Vol 4: Stop! Look! Listen! The film was later included on the Blu-ray compilation The Best of the COI. It is also included on some DVD and BD releases of The Long Good Friday (also the work of director John Mackenzie and cinematographer Phil Méheux).

See also
 Building Sites Bite
 The Finishing Line

References

External links
 
 Production details of Apaches
 

1977 in British television
ITV children's television shows
Public information films
Films directed by John Mackenzie (film director)
1970s educational films
1970s English-language films
British educational films